The Road to Yesterday is a 1925 American silent romantic drama film directed by Cecil B. DeMille. The film is significant because it was Cecil B. DeMille's first release from his new production company, DeMille Pictures Corporation. It was also upcoming actor William Boyd's first starring role. In DeMille's next picture, The Volga Boatman, which was a tremendous success, he cast Boyd as the solo leading man.

Plot
As described in a film magazine review, Malena, a young bride, has a fear of her husband Kenneth which she cannot understand but which he attributes to his unprepossessing physical appearance. Finally, angered, the young husband leaves his wife to go to Chicago and have a physical defect overcome, if this be possible. His wife leaves on the same train. The train is wrecked and the young man rescues his wife from death. Thereafter they understand each other.

Cast

Preservation
Prints of The Road to Yesterday reportedly survive at George Eastman House and in private collections. On September 24, 2013, the film was released on DVD by Alpha Video. Another DVD version was released on July 31, 2014, by The Video Cellar.

References

External links

The Road to Yesterday (1925) A Silent Film Review at moviessilently.com

1925 films
1925 drama films
Films directed by Cecil B. DeMille
1920s English-language films
American silent feature films
American black-and-white films
Producers Distributing Corporation films
Films with screenplays by F. Hugh Herbert
1920s American films
Silent American drama films